Evan Mitchell Lowenstein and Jaron David Lowenstein (born March 18, 1974) are American musicians and identical twin brothers who performed as Evan and Jaron. Evan and Jaron have recorded three studio albums. The duo's most successful single is "Crazy for This Girl", which peaked at No. 15 on the Billboard Hot 100 in 2000.

Early lives and family
Evan and Jaron Lowenstein grew up in Tucker, Georgia. They are identical twins. Their parents are Leslie (Diamond) and Charles Lowenstein. The duo were raised in an Orthodox Jewish family, and attended Greenfield Hebrew Academy and Yeshiva High School (which have since merged to form the Atlanta Jewish Academy). Through their mother, they are related (by marriage) to actor Logan Lerman.

Music career
Evan and Jaron began performing in the folk-pop genre in coffee houses in their hometown of Atlanta. In 1994, their live album, Live at KaLo's Coffee House was released. After touring for a year, Evan and Jaron released a second independent album, Not from Concentrate (1996) and performed at the 1996 Atlanta Olympics. While touring, they were noticed by Jimmy Buffett, who signed them to Island Records. Island released the album We've Never Heard of You Either in 1998.

In 2000, the duo released Evan and Jaron for Columbia Records. The album included the top 40 singles "Crazy for This Girl", "From My Head to My Heart", and "The Distance". With the benefit of heavy publicity from Columbia, "Crazy for This Girl" peaked at No. 15 and was included on the soundtrack of the Dawson's Creek television series; the single has become Evan and Jaron's "signature song".

Evan and Jaron released Half Dozen in 2004. According to Jaron, the duo was dropped by Columbia Records. The brothers then pursued other ventures.

In March 2006, the pair appeared on ABC's reality TV show American Inventor, showcasing their company Pit Port. Pit Port is a container for discarded seeds and pits in various fruits and nuts.

Other activities

Jaron Lowenstein released a solo single, "Pray for You", credited to Jaron and the Long Road to Love, to country radio in November 2009. The song reached the top 20 on the Hot Country Songs charts, and the top 40 of the Billboard Hot 100. Jaron released his debut album, Getting Dressed in the Dark, on June 22, 2010. The album debuted at #2 on the Billboard Top Country Albums chart selling 23,916 copies in its first week.

In 2019, a Hollywood Reporter article stated that Evan Lowenstein had become Kevin Spacey's manager in 2016.

Discography

Studio albums

Live albums

Singles

Notes

A  "From My Head to My Heart" did not enter the Billboard Hot 100, but peaked at number 24 on the Bubbling Under Hot 100 Singles chart, which acts as a 25-song extension to the Hot 100.
B  "The Distance" did not enter the Billboard Hot 100, but peaked at number 8 on the Bubbling Under Hot 100 Singles chart, which acts as a 25-song extension to the Hot 100.

References

External links
 Evan and Jaron on Myspace

Musical groups from Georgia (U.S. state)
Musical groups established in 1994
Musical groups disestablished in 2008
Twin musical duos
American Orthodox Jews
1994 establishments in Georgia (U.S. state)
2008 disestablishments in Georgia (U.S. state)
Male musical duos
Columbia Records artists
Island Records artists